Čelakovský is a Czech surname. The feminine gender is Čelakovská. Notable people with the surname include:

 František Ladislav Čelakovský (1799–1852), Czech writer and translator
 Ladislav Josef Čelakovský (1834–1902), Czech botanist, son of František Ladislav Čelakovský
 Jaromír Čelakovský (1846–1914), Czech historian, journalist and politician, son of František Ladislav Čelakovský
 Ladislav František Čelakovský (1863–1916), Czech botanist, son of Ladislav Josef Čelakovský

Czech-language surnames